Charles Lane (19 March 1905 – 14 December 1954) was an Australian sprinter. He competed in the men's 400 metres at the 1924 Summer Olympics.

References

External links
 

1905 births
1954 deaths
Athletes (track and field) at the 1924 Summer Olympics
Australian male sprinters
Olympic athletes of Australia
Place of birth missing